The European Championship is a PDC darts tournament which was created to allow the top European players to compete with the highest ranked players from the PDC Order of Merit. Since 2016, the tournament has taken place at the end of October, and features the top 32 players on the PDC European Tour Order of Merit.

History
The inaugural tournament – the 2008 European Championship – was held at the Südbahnhof in Frankfurt, Germany and featured a prize fund of £200,000.

The tournament moved to the Claus Hotel & Event Center in Hoofddorp, Netherlands for 2009 featuring a similar prize fund. The tournament returned to Germany in 2010, where it was held at Dinslaken. The 2011 tournament remained in Germany, only this time, it took place in Düsseldorf – the capital of North Rhine-Westphalia. From 2012 to 2014, the tournament took place in Mülheim, Germany, then between 2015 and 2017, the tournament took place in Hasselt, Belgium, but in 2018, the tournament will return to Germany, moving to the Westfalenhallen in Dortmund. It moved to Göttingen in 2019, before moving to the König Pilsener Arena in Oberhausen in 2020, and then the Salzburgarena in Salzburg, Austria in 2021, before returning to Dortmund again in 2022.

Phil Taylor won the tournament on each of the first four stagings of the event, before Simon Whitlock took the title in 2012. Adrian Lewis gained his third major win after beating Whitlock in the 2013 edition of the tournament. Michael van Gerwen won the tournament for the first time in 2014 beating Terry Jenkins in the final. In 2015, van Gerwen came back from 7–10 behind to defeat Gary Anderson 11–10 in the final, then he beat Mensur Suljović 11–1 in the 2016 final, and he won it for a fourth year in a row in 2017, when he defeated Rob Cross 11–7 in the 2017 final. In 2018, James Wade won the title, and in 2019 Rob Cross became European champion, then Peter Wright won in 2020, before Cross regained the title in 2021.

Finals

Records and statistics

Total finalist appearances

Champions by country

Nine-dart finishes
Four nine-darters have been thrown at the European Championship. The first one was in 2011.

High averages

Television coverage
The PDC announced on August 12, 2008 that ITV4 would broadcast the entire event. This was the second PDC darts tournament that ITV4 have broadcast, after the inaugural Grand Slam of Darts – after its rating success ITV had chosen to broadcast this event as well as the 2008 Grand Slam of Darts.

The 2009 event was not televised in the UK, but the 2010 event was broadcast on Bravo, which screened live darts for the first time in its history. However, Bravo ceased broadcasting at the start of 2011. On June 26, 2011, it was announced that ITV4 would broadcast the 2011 event. In the Netherlands it is broadcast on RTL7 and in Germany it is broadcast on Sport1. On August 8, 2012 it was announced that ESPN would televise the event, becoming the first broadcaster to show both BDO and PDC dart tournaments. From 2013, the tournament returned to ITV4 as part of a deal between ITV and the PDC to show 4 tournaments from the PDC calendar.

List of United Kingdom broadcasters
 2008; 2011; 2013–present: ITV4
 2010: Bravo
 2012: ESPN
 2009: not televised in the UK

Sponsorship
PartyPoker.net sponsored first six editions of the tournament – they also sponsored the US Open and the Las Vegas Desert Classic, two other non-defunct televised PDC events. In 2014, 888.com took over sponsoring of the tournament for one edition, with the tournament being sponsored by Unibet since 2015.  In 2021, the tournament will be sponsored by Cazoo, who will also sponsor the PDC World Cup of Darts and the Grand Slam of Darts.

References

External links
European Championship page on the PDC website
European Championship on Darts Database

 
Professional Darts Corporation tournaments
European championships
Recurring sporting events established in 2008
2008 establishments in Europe
Annual sporting events